Charlie May may refer to:

Charlie May (footballer) (1899–1989), Australian footballer and coach
Charlie May (producer), British record producer

See also
Charles May (disambiguation)
Charles Mays (1941–2005), American Olympic athlete and Democratic party politician